Solar Liberty is an American company that installs, sells and leases solar panel energy systems, known as photovoltaic (PV) systems, for homes, businesses, schools, universities, municipalities, non-profits, and other facilities and properties.

History
Solar Liberty was founded in 2003 in Buffalo, New York by brothers Adam Rizzo and Nathan Rizzo. Solar Liberty was named #1 Largest Solar Installer in New York State in 2018 (http://www.solarliberty.com/news/335-solar-liberty-recognized-as-top-solar-contractor-in-new-york.html). In 2008 it was ranked number 92 by Inc. Magazine in its annual list of fastest growing private companies in the U.S.  In 2012, it was ranked the number 6 fastest-growing private company in Western New York by the Business First publication.

The company headquarters is in Buffalo, NY—with offices in Rochester, Albany, Corning, Syracuse, Binghamton, and Plattsburgh (all in New York).

Installations
Solar Liberty is currently the #1 Largest Solar Installer in New York State. Installations are predominantly located in Western, Central New York State, New York City area and Northern Pennsylvania. Notable installations include, but are not limited to: Buffalo City Mission (48 kW, Donated in 2010), University at Buffalo Interactive 'Solar Strand' (2014), Cummins Engines (2013), Rochester Institute of Technology (RIT, 2 MW, 2014), Life Storage (formerly Uncle Bobs Storage, 27 locations, 2015), Town of Holland (2017), City of Rochester (Landfill, 2017), Monroe County (2017), and St. John's Annex Cemetery in Long Island (10 MW, Acquired by PSEG Solar Source, 2017) which is the 'Second-Largest Solar System in New York State).
  at the University at Buffalo in Amherst, NY. It is a 750-kilowatt, 3,200 panel photovoltaic array on the university’s north campus.

Solar Liberty Foundation
The Solar Liberty Foundation provides funding for renewable energy projects in developing nations. Completed projects include a health clinic, school and orphanage in Haiti, solar cookers in Kenya, and more solar donations to Liberia and Tanzania. During Fall 2017, a group of Solar Liberty volunteers traveled to Africa to provide solar energy to an all-girls school in Kitenga which is in Tanzania, Africa. This was the first time in history Kitenga has seen electricity. The Solar Liberty Foundation will continue to provide solar energy to underdeveloped communities throughout the world.

See also

 Solar power
 Efficient energy use

References

http://www.solarliberty.com/news/335-solar-liberty-recognized-as-top-solar-contractor-in-new-york.html
https://www.wnypapers.com/news/article/current/2018/07/26/133485/buffalo-based-solar-liberty-recognized-as-top-solar-contractor-in-new-york

Further reading
 Solar Liberty in line for UB contract – Buffalo – Business First
 Company’s growth radiates to developing world - Business - The Buffalo News
 Solar means savings for People Inc. - Buffalo - Business First
 News Archives: The Buffalo News
 City Mission Receives 'Green' Upgrade | WKBW News 7: News, Sports, Weather | Buffalo, NY | home
 Catholic schools are installing roof-based solar panels - News - The Buffalo News
 http://www.buffalo.edu/home/feature_story/solar-strand.html.html
 Homeowners Get Solar Panels Installed As Part of Solarize Tonawanda Program
 B-P School District Expects Solar Array Active by June
 New Solar Arrays Installed as Part of Solarize Amherst Campaign
 Earth Matters: Microgrids -- Let's Get Small
 BMCC Rooftop Now Home to Manhattan's Largest Solar Panel Project

External links
 Solar Liberty Official Website
 Solar Liberty Foundation Website

Photovoltaics manufacturers
Photovoltaics
Companies based in Buffalo, New York
Solar-powered devices
American brands